Javad Shahrestani (1924 – July 9, 2016) was an Iranian engineer, academic and politician who served as the Mayor of City of Tehran. He was the last mayor to serve under the Pahlavi Dynasty.
Born in Mashhad, he first became the mayor of Tehran in 1968 and served until 1969, when he was appointed first to Governorship of Kermanshah from 1969 to 1973 by the Shah of Iran, he was replaced by Gholamreza Nikpey. He was later appointed to the cabinet, and was the Minister of Transportation from 1973 to 1976. In 1977 he succeeded Nikpey as mayor and remained in the position until the Islamic Revolution of 1979.

In February 1979, after Ayatollah Khomeini's return to Tehran, and while Shapour Bakhtiar was still Prime Minister, he  submitted his resignation to Khomeini, who in turn reappointed him as mayor.

He was replaced after the revolution by Mohammad Tavasoli, and never held a public position after the revolution.

He is one of the few politicians to serve under the Shah, who was not arrested after the revolution. He became a professor at Ferdowsi University of Mashhad.

References

Sources 
www.tehran.com

1924 births
2016 deaths
Iranian engineers
Mayors of Tehran
Academic staff of Ferdowsi University of Mashad
Iran Novin Party politicians
Rastakhiz Party politicians